The 1995–96 Romanian Hockey League season was the 66th season of the Romanian Hockey League. Six teams participated in the league, and Steaua Bucuresti won the championship.

Regular season

Playoffs

Final
CSA Steaua Bucuresti - Sportul Studențesc București 16-2,10-1

3rd place
SC Miercurea Ciuc - CSM Dunărea Galați 11-2,13-2

5th place
CS Progym Gheorgheni - HC Sfântu-Gheorghe 5-2,6-1

External links 
 Season on hockeyarchives.info

Romanian Hockey League seasons
Romanian
Rom